The Charnel House is a 2016 dark fantasy horror film directed by Craig Moss and written by Chad Israel and Emanuel Isler. The film stars Callum Blue, Nadine Velazquez, Makenzie Moss and Erik LaRay Harvey.

Plot synopsis
The film involves a long abandoned slaughterhouse that was transformed into a loft apartment in a re-gentrified urban neighborhood. Shortly after the tenants move in, they are tormented by a dark secret that has been trapped inside the building for more than 30 years.

Cast
 Callum Blue as Alex Reaves
 Nadine Velazquez as Charlotte Reaves
 Makenzie Moss as Mia Reaves
 Erik LaRay Harvey as Devin Pyles
 Alden Tab as Rupert
 Danielle Lauder as Emily Turner
 Andy Favreau as Jackson Davies
 Kate Linder as Aunt Rachel

Reception

References

External links
 

2016 horror films
2016 films
American horror films
2010s English-language films
Films directed by Craig Moss
2010s American films